The Memorial Civic Center is a multi-sport recreation and conference facility in Campbellton, New Brunswick. The Memorial Civic Centre opened in downtown Campbellton on the bank of the Restigouche River in 1992.  It was built to replace the Memorial Gardens which was destroyed by a fire in 1990. The Memorial Gardens was located on Arran St.

The complex is equipped to accommodate sporting events, entertainment, commercial functions and trade shows on a local, regional, provincial or national basis. The Memorial Civic Center is designed to host Olympic competitions, provide training facilities for Canada's national teams and promote recreational and sporting opportunities for all age groups.

It is home to the Campbellton Tigers hockey team.

Facilities

 a 3,500-seat multi-purpose arena, containing an Olympic size ice surface
 another Olympic-size ice surface for practice
 a removable indoor soccer turf
 a 25-metre, 8-lane, semi-Olympic swimming pool
 a wading pool
 a  water slide
 250-seat lounge overlooking the main arena and an outdoor rooftop patio
 400-seat conference room for conventions and receptions
 several meeting rooms, 2 multi-purpose rooms, 8 changing rooms
 weight training, aerobics and fitness centre
 racquet ball and squash courts
 2 canteens

External links
City of Campbellton
Campbellton Tigers

Buildings and structures in Restigouche County, New Brunswick
Campbellton, New Brunswick
Indoor arenas in New Brunswick
Indoor ice hockey venues in Canada
Monuments and memorials in New Brunswick
Sports venues in New Brunswick
Sports venues completed in 1992
1992 establishments in New Brunswick